Filipe is a common first name in Portuguese-speaking countries. It is a Portuguese and Galician spelling of the name Philip (aka Phillip) (the name is spelled Felipe in Spanish and in archaic Portuguese orthography).

Famous Filipes

Royalty
There are several Spanish kings who were named Felipe. The three Felipes that also ruled over Portugal were known in Portugal as Filipe (with an "i"):

Filipe I of Portugal (II of Spain)
Filipe II of Portugal (III of Spain)
Filipe III of Portugal (IV of Spain)

Sports
Filipe Luís Kasmirski Brazilian footballer.

Other
Filipe Nery Xavier (1801-1875), Goan-Português administrator and historian

Portuguese masculine given names